"Chase the Chance" is Namie Amuro's second solo single on the Avex Trax label. Released in December 1995, it debuted at number one on the Oricon charts becoming her first of five million selling singles. As of August 2012, the single has sold 1.3 million copies in Japan. At the end of the month, she would make her first appearance as a solo artist on Kōhaku Uta Gassen performing the single. It is the last single before she and MAX permanently split ways, even though MAX do not appear in the accompanying music video.

A pre-release TV commercial for the single features excerpts from the music videos for her four previous singles (including three singles released by Toshiba-EMI) in slow motion and in black and white.

Commercial tie-in 
"Chase the Chance" was used as the theme song to the Nihon TV drama, "The Chef."

Track listing

Personnel 
 Namie Amuro – vocals, background vocals

Production 
 Producer – Tetsuya Komuro
 Arranger – Tetsuya Komuro
 Mixing – Gary Thomas Wright

TV performances 
 December 31, 1995 – Kōhaku Uta Gassen

Charts 
Oricon Sales Chart (Japan)

Oricon Sales Chart (Japan)

References

External links 
 Songwriter, Takahiro Maeda's thoughts on the single (Japanese)

1995 singles
Namie Amuro songs
Oricon Weekly number-one singles
Japanese television drama theme songs
Songs written by Tetsuya Komuro
1995 songs
Avex Trax singles